Northern Rio Grande National Heritage Area is a federally designated National Heritage Area in the U.S. state of New Mexico. The national heritage area includes a section of the upper Rio Grande Valley that has been inhabited by the Puebloan peoples since the early Pre-Columbian era.

Three counties, Santa Fe, Taos, and Rio Arriba are included in the designated National Heritage Area. The Northern Rio Grande National Heritage Area was authorized in 2006 by Public Law 109-338.

Sites

Pueblos
Eight pueblos are included in the National Heritage Area: 
Nambé Pueblo
Ohkay Owingeh Pueblo,
Picuris Pueblo
Pojoaque Pueblo
San Ildefonso Pueblo
Santa Clara Pueblo
Taos Pueblo — a World Heritage Site.
Tesuque Pueblo

The Jicarilla Apache reservation is also within in the heritage area.

Spanish colonial sites

The heritage area also commemorates the influence of Hispanic colonists from the Viceroyalty of New Spain (colonial México), who arrived in the late 1590s and onwards.

Spanish colonial sites in the National Heritage Area include:
 Historic center−core of Santa Fe
 Ranchos de Taos
 16 National Historic Landmarks
 270 other historic properties, including those on the National Register of Historic Places, of the pre-statehood era.

Natural areas
Natural areas protected at the federal level within the National Heritage Area include portions of:
Santa Fe National Forest
Carson National Forest
Valles Caldera National Preserve
Bandelier National Monument
Pecos National Monument.

State parks
New Mexico state parks within the heritage area include:
Cerrillos Hills State Park
Hyde Memorial State Park
Heron Lake State Park
El Vado Lake State Park

Scenic drives and byways
Scenic drives and byways with sections through parts of the heritage area include: 
Enchanted Circle Scenic Byway
Puyé Scenic Byway
El Camino Real National Scenic Byway
Route 66 National Scenic Byway
Santa Fe National Forest Scenic Byway
Santa Fe Trail National Scenic Byway
Wild Rivers Back Country Scenic Byway
High Road to Taos

See also
Ancient Pueblo peoples
Puebloan peoples
Colonial New Mexico
Santa Fe de Nuevo México Province
Northern New Mexico
National Historic Landmarks in New Mexico
National Register of Historic Places listings in Rio Arriba County, New Mexico
National Register of Historic Places listings in Santa Fe County, New Mexico
National Register of Historic Places listings in Taos County, New Mexico

References

External links

 Official Northern Rio Grande National Heritage Area website
 U.S. National Park Service.gov: Northern Rio Grande National Heritage Area website

 
Rio Grande
National Park Service areas in New Mexico
National Heritage Areas of the United States
Pueblo history
Pre-statehood history of New Mexico
Protected areas of Rio Arriba County, New Mexico
Protected areas of Santa Fe County, New Mexico
Protected areas of Taos County, New Mexico
Protected areas established in 2006
2006 establishments in New Mexico
History of the Rocky Mountains